Migliarino Pisano is a village in Tuscany, central Italy,  administratively a frazione of the comune of Vecchiano, province of Pisa. At the time of the 2001 census its population was 2,678.

Migliarino Pisano is about 6 km from Pisa and 5 km from Vecchiano.

References 

Frazioni of the Province of Pisa